Legionella spiritensis is a Gram-negative bacterium from the genus Legionella which was  isolated from the Spirit Lake near Mount St. Helens.

References

External links
Type strain of Legionella spiritensis at BacDive -  the Bacterial Diversity Metadatabase

Legionellales
Bacteria described in 1985